is a Fukui Railway Fukubu Line railway station located in the city of Fukui, Fukui Prefecture, Japan.

Lines

Station layout
The station consists of two ground-level opposed side platforms connected by a level crossing. The station is unattended.

Adjacent stations

History
The station opened on July 26, 1925.

Surrounding area
 Ebata-chō Public Hall
 Fukui Municipal Ebata Danchi
 Fukui Sen'i Warehouse company headquarters
 Fukui Forest Association headquarters

See also
 List of railway stations in Japan

External links

  

Railway stations in Fukui Prefecture
Railway stations in Japan opened in 1925
Fukui Railway Fukubu Line
Fukui (city)